Compadre Academy (formerly Compadre High School) is a high school in the Tempe Union High School District in Tempe, Arizona.  It serves as a faster paced alternative high school for students who wish to get ahead in their high school credits. Compadre Academy formerly consisted of two campuses due to one of the schools being under construction to add more facilities. Subsequently, the other school was closed and has since had its students moved to the now much larger and renovated campus.

Athletics
Compadre Academy's mascot is the Lobo.

Partnership
In 2017, Tempe Union High School District entered into an agreement with Arizona State University to operate a charter school on the Compadre Academy campus, alongside the existing school. The new school, part of a network of the ASU Preparatory Academy charter schools operated by Arizona State University, will be called ASU Prep Compadre High School. The school will admit 100 9th and 10th graders in its first year and plans to grow to 400 students. It will offer Cambridge Curriculum and Arizona State University college courses in a blended (digital and in-person) format. Students will be required to complete a capstone course each year.

References

External links
Compadre High School website

Public high schools in Arizona
Education in Tempe, Arizona
Schools in Maricopa County, Arizona